Paranoid Circus is the third studio album by the German folk metal band Lyriel originally released on Femme Metal Records in December 2009. The album was re-released on AFM Records in April 2011 with a new cover artwork and 2 bonus tracks.

Reception
The Sonic Seducer observed that the band had notably moved away from their roots in medieval themes towards folk elements without losing their originality. Rock Hard wrote in contrast that the band had not changed their style but gained more routine while keeping a standard folk sound.

Track listing

Personnel
Jessica Thierjung - vocals
Oliver Thierjung - guitars, backing vocals
Linda Laukamp - cello, backing vocals
Daniel de Beer - drums
Sven Engelmann - bass
Joon Laukamp - violin
Martin Ahmann - keyboards

References

2009 albums
Lyriel albums
AFM Records albums